Spirit Unforgettable is a Canadian documentary film, which premiered at the Hot Docs Canadian International Documentary Festival in 2016. Directed by Pete McCormack, the film profiles the Canadian folk rock band Spirit of the West in preparation for a 2015 concert at Massey Hall, as part of their farewell tour following lead singer John Mann's diagnosis with early-onset Alzheimer's disease, interspersing the story of his diagnosis and the band's preparations for the concert with a portrait of their overall history.

At the time of the Massey Hall concert, it was possible but not definitive that due to Mann's cognitive decline, the show may have become the band's last concert performance. The band did, however, ultimately perform a few more times following the show, most notably for a three-night series of finale performances at Vancouver's Commodore Ballroom in April 2016.

Other figures appearing in the film include Mann's wife Jill Daum, an actress and playwright who has written her own theatrical play about Alzheimer's, Forget About Tomorrow; musician Paul Hyde, a longtime friend and early collaborator of the band, who both talks about his relationship with the band and performs a rendition of his song "I Miss My Mind the Most"; Mann and Daum's daughter Hattie Daumann; musician Craig Northey; the band's manager Janet Forsyth; former band member J. Knutson; and two of Mann's doctors.

McCormack, a longtime friend of the band, invested $100,000 of his own money in the film up front, telling The Globe and Mail that "I had to go and dive in right away … funding or no funding, because of the disease." The film did later secure funding, including a completion grant from the Shaw Media/Hot Docs Fund.

Many critics have singled out the band's live performance of their signature song "Home for a Rest" near the end of the film, which saw the entire audience begin to sing along the moment Mann had a slip in remembering the lyrics, as its life-affirming emotional climax.

The film aired on HBO Canada on July 1, 2016.

Awards
At the 2016 Vancouver International Film Festival in October 2016, Spirit Unforgettable won the award for Most Popular Canadian Documentary (based on audience balloting).

See also
Long Time Running

References

External links
 
 

2016 films
2016 documentary films
Canadian documentary films
Documentary films about musical groups
Documentary films about dementia
Films directed by Pete McCormack
2010s English-language films
2010s Canadian films